This is the List of Representatives of the Islamic Consultative Assembly (Parliament of Iran) by term:

 List of Iran's parliament representatives (1st term) (1980–1984)
 List of Iran's parliament representatives (2nd term) (1984–1988)
 List of Iran's parliament representatives (3rd term) (1988–1992)
 List of Iran's parliament representatives (4th term) (1992–1996)
 List of Iran's parliament representatives (5th term) (1996–2000)
 List of Iran's parliament representatives (6th term) (2000–2004)
 List of Iran's parliament representatives (7th term) (2004–2008)
 List of Iran's parliament representatives (8th term) (2008–2012)
 List of Iran's parliament representatives (9th term) (2012–2016)
 List of Iran's parliament representatives (10th term) (2016–2020)
 List of Iran's parliament representatives (11th term) (2020–present)

See also 
 List of Iranian officials
 List of speakers of the Parliament of Iran

Set index articles
Members of the Islamic Consultative Assembly
Islamic Consultative Assembly